Benjamin Stanton (June 4, 1809 – June 2, 1872) was an American politician who served as the sixth lieutenant governor of Ohio from 1862 to 1864.

Early life
The son of Elias & Martha (Wilson) Stanton, he was born in Mount Pleasant, Ohio, Stanton pursued academic studies, and learned the tailor's trade.  Stanton studied law and was admitted to the bar in 1834, and began practicing law in Bellefontaine, Ohio.

Career
Stanton served as a member of the Ohio Senate from 1841 to 1843, and as delegate to the state constitutional convention in 1850.

Stanton was elected as a U.S. Representative from Ohio twice. He served as a Whig to the Thirty-second Congress, from 1851 to 1853.

From 1855 to 1861, he served as an Opposition Party candidate to the Thirty-fourth Congress and reelected as a Republican to the Thirty-fifth and Thirty-sixth Congresses. Stanton served as chairman of the Committee on Military Affairs (Thirty-sixth Congress).

Stanton served as lieutenant governor of Ohio in 1862, during the American Civil War.  After the battle of Shiloh, in April 1862, at Pittsburg Landing, Tennessee, Stanton visited the Union Army and soon published a statement critical of the Union generals.  He opined that Ulysses S. Grant and Benjamin M. Prentiss, both appointed from Illinois, should be court-martialed and shot. General William Tecumseh Sherman, appointed from Ohio, published a sharp rebuttal. This led to Stanton's criticizing Sherman as well. In his memoirs, Sherman claimed that after "the good people of the North ha(d) begun to have their eyes opened" (referring perhaps to his own rebuttals of Stanton) Stanton's criticisms of Grant were so soundly rejected that Stanton never again held any public office and that he was commonly spoken of as "the late Mr. Stanton". Stanton's move from Ohio to West Virginia would seem to support that statement.

Stanton moved to Martinsburg, West Virginia, in 1865, and practiced law.  He moved to Wheeling, West Virginia, in 1867 and continued the practice of law.

Death
Stanton died in Wheeling on June 2, 1872, two days before his sixty-third birthday, and was interred in Greenwood Cemetery in Wheeling, West Virginia.

References

External links

 

1809 births
1872 deaths
People from Mount Pleasant, Ohio
Whig Party members of the United States House of Representatives from Ohio
Opposition Party members of the United States House of Representatives from Ohio
Ohio Republicans
Republican Party members of the United States House of Representatives
Lieutenant Governors of Ohio
Ohio state senators
Ohio Constitutional Convention (1850)
Ohio lawyers
People from Bellefontaine, Ohio
West Virginia lawyers
Burials at Greenwood Cemetery (Wheeling, West Virginia)
19th-century American politicians
19th-century American lawyers
Lawyers from Martinsburg, West Virginia
Lawyers from Wheeling, West Virginia